The Catasterismi or Catasterisms (Greek Καταστερισμοί Katasterismoi, "Constellations" or "Placings Among the Stars"), is a lost work attributed to  Eratosthenes of Cyrene. It was a comprehensive compendium of astral mythology including origin myths of the stars and constellations. Only a summary of the original work survives, called the Epitome Catasterismorum, by an unknown author sometimes referred to as pseudo-Eratosthenes.

Summary
The Epitome records the mature and definitive development of a long process: the Hellenes' assimilation of a Mesopotamian zodiac, transmitted through Persian interpreters and translated and harmonized with the known terms of Greek mythology. A fundamental effort in this translation was the application of Greek mythic nomenclature to designate individual stars, both asterisms like the Pleiades and Hyades, and the constellations. In Classical Greece, the "wandering stars" and the gods who directed them were separate entities, as for Plato; in Hellenistic culture, the association became an inseparable identification, so that Apollo, no longer the regent of the Sun, actually was Helios (Seznec 1981, pp 37–40).

Chapters 1–42 of the Epitome treat forty-three of the forty-eight constellations (including the Pleiades) known to Ptolemy (2nd century CE); chapters 43–44 treat the five planets and the Milky Way. 

† Not one of the modern constellations.

Of the 48 Ptolemaic constellations, the ones not included are Corona Australis, Equuleus, Libra, Lupus, and Serpens. In modern times, Argo Navis (the ship Argo) has been divided into three constellations: Carina (the keel), Puppis (the stern), and Vela (the sails); and the Pleiades are recognized as a star cluster within the constellation Taurus.

The work cites in some places the lost Astronomia attributed to Hesiod. A similar later account is the Poeticon Astronomicon, or De Astronomica (tellingly also titled De Astrologia in some manuscripts that follow Hyginus' usage in his text) attributed to Gaius Julius Hyginus. 

During the Renaissance, printing of the Epitome under the title Catasterismi, began early, but the work was always overshadowed by Hyginus, the only other ancient repertory of catasterisms. The Catasterismi was illustrated by woodcuts in the first illustrated edition by Erhard Ratdolt, (Venice 1482). Johann Schaubach's edition of the Catasterismi (Meiningen 1791) was also illustrated with celestial maps drawn from another work, Johann Buhle's Aratus (Leipzig, 2 volumes, 1793–1801).

After the old Teubner edition of A.  Olivieri, Pseudo-Eratosthenis Catasterismi (Leipzig 1897), the text has a new complete edition including the recensio Fragmenta Vaticana

Notes

References
Condos, Theony, Star Myths of the Greeks and Romans: A Sourcebook, Containing The Constellations of Pseudo-Eratosthenes and the Poetic Astronomy of Hyginus (Grand Rapids [MI]: Phanes Press, 1997)  (hb);  (pb). Reviewed by Roger Ceragioli in: Journal for the History of Astronomy, 30.1 (1999), pp. 313–315; by John McMahon in: Archaeoastronomy: The Journal of Astronomy in Culture, XVI (2001), pp. 98–99 and by John T. Ramsey, as "Bryn Mawr Classical Review 98.6.28".
 Decker, Elly, Illustrating the Phaenomena: Celestial Cartography in Antiquity and the Middle Ages, Oxford University Press, 2013. .
 Hard, Robin, (trans.) Eratosthenes and Hyginus: Constellation Myths, With Aratus's Phaenomena, Oxford University Press, 2015. .
 Kanas, Nick, Star Maps: History, Artistry, and Cartography, Springer, 2009. .
Seznec, Jean, The Survival of the Pagan Gods (Princeton [NJ]: Princeton University Press, 1981).

External links
The Katasterismoi: Part 1 and Part 2 in ADSABS
 Mythographoi. Scriptores poetiace historiae graeci, Antonius Westermann (ed.), Brunsvigae sumptum fecit Georgius Westermann, 1843, pagg. 239-67.
Mythographi Graeci, Alexander Olivieri (ed.), vol. III, fasc. I, Lipsiae in aedibus B. G. Teubneri, 1897.
 Eratosthenis catasterismorum fragmenta vaticana, Albert Rehm (ed.), Ansbach, Druck von C. Bruegel & Sohn, 1899.
Italica: Rinascimento: Ilaria Miarelli Mariani, "Astrologia" (in Italian)
Bradley E. Schaefer, "The epoch of the constellations on the Farnese Atlas and their origins in Hipparchus's lost catalogue"
Daniel Marin, "The History of Constellations" (in Spanish)
Ian Ridpath,  Star Tales – The mythographers
Ancient astronomy
Astrological texts
Ancient Greek pseudepigrapha
References on Greek mythology